Dorsal intercalated segment instability (DISI) is a deformity of the wrist where the lunate bone angulates to the dorsal side of the hand.

Causes
The main causes of DISI are:
Wrist trauma, with or without a fracture
Scaphoid fracture: bony DISI
Distal radius fracture: compensatory DISI
Malunion of radius fracture: adaptive DISI
Scapholunate ligament instability: ligamentous DISI

References

Orthopedics